Carlos Alberto Reis de Paula (born February 26, 1944 in Pedro Leopoldo, Minas Gerais, Brazil) is the first Afro-Brazilian president of Brazilian Superior Labor Court (Tribunal Superior do Trabalho).

References

1944 births
People from Pedro Leopoldo
Living people
20th-century Brazilian judges